Steven Dexter (born August 26, 1962) is a theatre director and writer.

Early life
Dexter was born in South Africa, then he moved to London in 1984 and studied at the London Academy of Music and Dramatic Art.

West End productions 
In 2003 he directed both Peter Pan and The Pirates of Penzance, playing in repertoire at the Savoy Theatre, London.

His production of La Cava (book by Dana Broccoli, lyrics by John Claflin and Shaun McKenna, music by Laurence O'Keefe and Stephen Keeling) transferred from the Churchill Theatre, Bromley to the Victoria Palace Theatre, London, in 2000, transferring to the Piccadilly Theatre in 2001.

In October 2012 his production of Loserville transferred to the Garrick Theatre, London, in a co-production between Kevin Wallace Productions, West Yorkshire Playhouse, TC Beech and Youth Music Theatre UK (now British Youth Music Theatre).

As a book writer, he co-wrote Maddie, (with Shaun McKenna, music by Stephen Keeling), produced by Kenny Wax Productions, which transferred to the Lyric Theatre, Shaftesbury Avenue in 1997 and he directed Romance! Romance!, which transferred to the Gielgud Theatre, London, in the same year.

Other productions 

He directed the world premiere and 2007 revival of the Olivier Award winning musical Honk! at the Watermill Theatre, Newbury. In Derby he directed the world premiere of The Pros, The Cons and a Screw in 2009.  Also in 2009, he directed the world premiere of a new musical, Loserville: The Musical for Youth Music Theatre UK, written by James Bourne and Elliot Davis.

Dexter worked extensively for the Habima Theatre, the Israeli National Theatre, directing Honk! (2000), Mary-Lou (2002), The Full Monty (2003), Shirley Valentine (2005) and High School Musical (2008).  In Singapore he directed Forbidden City: Portrait of An Empress (2002) (a collaboration with Stephen Clark and Dick Lee) and Fried Rice Paradise (2010).

2019
 ROMANCE, ROMANCE, Above The Stag Theatre, London 
 FANNY AND STELLA, Above The Stag Theatre, London
 PAPERBOY, Lyric Theatre, Belfast BYMT
 CLOSER TO HEAVEN, Above The Stag Theatre, London

2018
 PIPPIN, Tring Park School for the Performing Arts  
 BEAUTIFUL THING, Above The Stag Theatre, London.
 PAPERBOY, Youth Music Theatre UK,	Lyric Theatre, Belfast. 
 RUPERT STREET, Above The Stag Theatre, London
 GRUMPY OLD MEN, Theatrical Rights Worldwide

2017
 HOSPITAL THE MUSICAL, Israel Workshop
 WHEN HARRY MET BARRY, Above The Stag Theatre, London
 FORBIDDEN CITY, Singapore Repertory Theatre, Esplanade Theatre Singapore
 MU-LAN, Singapore Workshop
 ON THE TOWN, Mountview

2016

 MARY LOU, Israel
 MU-LAN, Workshop London
 JASON AND THE ARGONAUTS, London School of Musical Theatre, Bridewell Theatre 
 THE SINS OF JACK SAUL, Above The Stag Theatre, London. 
 PASSPORT TO PIMLICO, London Workshop
 WHAT I GO TO SCHOOL FOR, Youth Music Theatre UK, Theatre Royal Brighton
 SAVING JASON, Park Theatre, London

2015
 ON THE TOWN, Guildford School of Acting
 THE BOY NEXT-DOOR, Workshop
 FANNY AND STELLA, Above The Stag Theatre, London
 THE LKY MUSICAL, Singapore Repertory Theatre
 FAGIN, Youth Music Theatre UK, South Hill Park Arts Centre, Bracknell		
 INTO THE WOODS, Royal Welsh College of Music & Drama, Cardiff

2014
 CHESS, Guildford School of Acting, Union Theatre
 THE OTHER SCHOOL, Guildford School of Acting
 FANNY AND STELLA, Above The Stag Theatre, Workshop
 LKY, Singapore Repertory Theatre, Workshop
 THE BOY NEXT DOOR, Workshop
 ALTAR BOYZ, Paul Taylor Mills Productions, Greenwich Theatre
 THE ADDAMS FAMILY, Guildford School of Acting

External links 
http://www.guardian.co.uk/stage/2007/dec/03/theatre
https://web.archive.org/web/20110616043951/http://www.whatsonstage.com/index.php?pg=209&name=Steven+Dexter

References 

1962 births
Living people
South African dramatists and playwrights
South African theatre directors
Writers from Cape Town